The Cox–Budlong House is a historic house at 4396 River Road near Scottsville, Monroe County, New York.

Description and history 
The house was built in about 1820 by an early settler of Wheatland in the Federal style. It was renovated about 1869 with Greek Revival and Italianate styles. It consists of a two-story Italianate-style main house with a -story east-end addition. The frame dwelling has an overhanging hipped roof topped by a cupola and finial. Also on the property are the contributing Victorian-era iron fence and the remnants of a late-19th-century cast-iron fountain.

It was listed on the National Register of Historic Places on February 12, 2015.

References

Houses on the National Register of Historic Places in New York (state)
Federal architecture in New York (state)
Greek Revival architecture in New York (state)
Italianate architecture in New York (state)
Houses completed in 1820
Houses in Monroe County, New York
National Register of Historic Places in Monroe County, New York